New Metal Leader is the debut album recorded by guitarist Ross "the Boss" Friedman and his German band under the moniker, "The Ross the Boss Band". It was released on August 22, 2008 on Candlelight records in the US and A.F.M. Records in Europe.

Background
While the band is called, "Ross the Boss", Friedman has stated that "It is a real band with each member having his share of the whole." When asked about the meaning of the title "New Metal Leader", Friedman said "There are several reasons why I chose the title. People do consider me a leader in metal. It is a metal record. And I may not be new, but my band certainly is. The last thing I did [in the same musical vein as "New Metal Leader"] was [the Manowar album] Kings of Metal. The title of this new record had to be in the same realm; it had to have the same sick sense of humor."

Track listing

Notes
The tracks, "Plague of Lies" and "Constantine's Sword" were co-written by Ross for the Brain Surgeons, with Albert Bouchard (former Blue Öyster Cult drummer), and Deborah Frost., and originally appear on the Brain Surgeons 2006 album, "Denial of Death".

Personnel
Band
Ross the Boss - guitar, keyboards
Patrick Fuchs - vocals, guitars
Carsten Kettering - bass
Matthias "Matze" Mayer - drums
Session Members
Tarek Maghary - keyboards on "I Got the Right" and "We Will Kill"
Christof Steiner - keyboards on "I.L.H.", "God of Dying" and "Immortal Son"
Miscellaneous staff
John Rup - recording (additional)
Ronny Lang	- arrangements (choir), producer
Tarek "MS" Maghary	- recording (tracks 1-11)
Achim Köhler - mixing, mastering
Dimitar Nikolov - cover art
Oliver Szczypula - recording (track 12)
Ross the Boss - producer

References

2008 debut albums
Ross the Boss albums